Khelein Hum Jee Jaan Sey is the soundtrack album to the 2010 period film of the same name, composed by Sohail Sen. The lyrics are penned by Javed Akhtar. The film is based on the book Do And Die by Manini Chatterjee, which is based on the Chittagong Uprising of 1930, directed by Ashutosh Gowariker. The album consists of twelve tracks; including five songs and seven background score cues. It was released on 27 October 2010, by T-Series.

Production
The film's songs and film score were composed by Sohail Sen, who had worked on Ashutosh's previous film What's Your Raashee?. The lyrics are penned by Javed Akhtar. The music was launched on 27 October 2010. The official soundtrack consists of twelve tracks; including five songs and seven background score cues, some of which have been arranged and programmed by Simaab Sen.  The title track has been sung by the pupils from Suresh Wadkar's music academy. Malayalam playback singer Ranjini Jose made her Bollywood debut through the song "Naiyn Tere". Composer Sohail Sen himself features as the voice of Surjya Sen, whilst Pamela Jain and Ranjini Jose features as the vocals of Kalpana Dutta and Pritilata Waddedar, respectively.

Track listing
The complete track listing of the soundtrack was released on the same day of the music launch, on the film’s official Facebook page.

Reception

The soundtrack album met with generally positive reviews from the critics. Bollywood Hungama, rated the album 3 out of 5 and quoted it as "Music here is not bad by any means but it is not instant coffee" and overall "Khelein Hum Jee Jaan Sey is a good quality album". Rediff.com gave the album 3.5 out of 5 and said "The soundtrack of Khelein Hum Jee Jaan Sey lends an inexplicable satisfaction that comes from seeing a movie". Planet Bollywood, praised Sen's work and quoted as "Sohail Sen delivers the goods! He’s stuck to the genre and has done terrifically well in that too", rating it 7 out of 10. Music Aloud said, "Seeing that Gowariker already had Lagaan, Sohail Sen ran a serious risk of falling under Lagaan shadow in Khelein Hum Jee Jaan Sey, but he has come out wonderfully, even shaking off What's Your Raashee? blues in the process. Hat's off!", giving it 8.5 out of 10.

Album credits

Musicians
Sivamani – drums, percussions
Sunil Das – sitar
Ulhas Bapat – santoor
Naveen, Ashwin Shrinivasan – flute
Jeetendra Thakur – violin
Pradeepta Sen Gupta, Chandrakant Lakshapati – banjo
Pratap Rath, Suresh Soni, Nirmal Mukharji, Shivanand Bangar – rhythm
Suraj Sathe – accordion
Levin D'Costa – whistle
Cine Musicians Association, Mumbai – strings section

Production
Producer: Sohail Sen
Recording Engineer: Shantanu Hudlikar
Assistant Engineer: Nitish Kumar
Recorded at: YRF Studios by Shantanu Hudlikar, Saba Studio by Rafiq Sen
Mastered by: Aditya Modi at Premier Digital Mastering Studios, Mumbai
Pro-Tools Engineer: Abhishek Khandelwal
Logic Pro & Nuendo Engineer: Rafiq Sen
Mixed at: Saba Studio by Sohail Sen
Arranger: Prakash Peters
Additional Programming: Simaab Sen, Rajeev Bhatt
Rhythm Conductor: Sanjeev Sen
Music co-ordination: Ramanand Shetty, Sheshappa T. Poojari
Music Editor: Rafiq Sen

References

2010 soundtrack albums
Hindi film soundtracks